The American Occupational Therapy Association (AOTA) is the national professional association established in 1917 to represent the interests and concerns of occupational therapy practitioners and students and improve the quality of occupational therapy services. AOTA membership is approximately 63,000 occupational therapists, occupational therapy assistants, and students.

The National Society for the Promotion of Occupational Therapy was the founding name of the AOTA.  William Rush Denton and Thomas B. Kidner were two notable founders of the original society.

AOTA designated April as Occupational Therapy Month.

See also 
 American Journal of Occupational Therapy published by AOTA since 1947
 Anna Jean Ayres (1920–1989), a developmental psychologist known for her work in the area of sensory processing disorder
 American Occupational Therapy Foundation, a charitable, scientific and educational non-profit organization dedicated to the advancement of occupational therapy and increased public understanding

References

External links
 

Health care-related professional associations based in the United States
Occupational therapy organizations
Organizations established in 1917
Healthcare accreditation organizations in the United States
501(c)(6) nonprofit organizations